Mohammad Abdullah, also called Abdulla or Abdullah, is known for killing John Paxton Norman, Chief Justice in the High Court at Fort William in Bengal.

Assassination of Norman
Justice Norman was accused for giving harsh sentence to freedom fighters. This was the main reason for the assassination.

In 1871, while Norman was coming down the steps of the Kolkata Town Hall, Abdullah, attacked him and stabbed him to death. He died on 21 September 1871.

Also read
Sher Ali Afridi
Ashfaqulla Khan

References

Indian rebels
Executed revolutionaries
Indian revolutionaries
19th-century executions by British India
Indian nationalists
Indian independence armed struggle activists
Executed assassins
Executed Indian people
People executed by British India by hanging
19th-century executions by the United Kingdom
People convicted of murder by India
Indian people convicted of murder
19th-century Indian Muslims
19th-century Indian criminals
19th-century executions by India
1871 deaths